Coleophora fuscociliella is a moth of the family Coleophoridae. It is found from Germany and Poland to Italy, North Macedonia, and Romania. It is also known in southern Russia.

The larvae feed on Coronilla and Medicago species. They create a slender, laterally compressed sheath case. The case has a number of fine diagonal ridges running backwards and downwards. The rear end is bent down somewhat and is darker than the remainder of the case. The mouth angle is about 20°. Larvae can be found from autumn to June of the following year.

References

fuscociliella
Moths described in 1849
Moths of Europe